Ameri (also Romanized as ‘Āmerī, Āmerī, and Amri) is a village in Howmeh Rural District of the Central District of Deylam County, Bushehr province, Iran. At the 2006 census, its population was 1,580 in 316 households. The following census in 2011 counted 1,694 people in 431 households. The latest census in 2016 showed a population of 1,558 people in 443 households; it was the largest village in its rural district.

References 

Populated places in Deylam County